The Aluva Palace, also known as Alwaye Palace is a Travancore royal palace built by king Maharaja Karthika Thirunal Dharma Raja around 1900 during the reign of the Chera kings of Travancore. Aluva Palace is situated in the city Kochi, Ernakulam district of the state of Kerala.

Historical importance

Historical reports suggested that the Palace was once used a residence by the royal family of Travancore. The monument also served as a guest house for the people who used to visit the royal family. The monument is positioned on the banks of the Periyar River. After the death of King Chithira Thirunal Balarama Varma in 1991, the palace was taken over by the state government of Kerala and is taken care of by the government which now serves as a hospitality centre.

References

Houses completed in 1900
Palaces in Kochi
Royal residences in India
Archaeological sites in Kerala
Museums in Kochi
Monuments of National Importance in Kerala
1900 establishments in India
20th-century architecture in India